Bal Labhu Ram Mukand (1908–1979), better known by his penname Arsh Malsiani, was an Indian Urdu poet and writer. He was the son of Josh Malsiyani, an Urdu and Persian scholar and poet. From 1948 up to his retirement in 1968, Malsiani worked in the Publications Division of the Government of India firstly as an Assistant Editor of the Urdu monthly journal Aaj Kal    then edited by Josh Malihabadi whom he succeeded as Editor in 1954.

Four collections of his poetry were published: Haft Rang, Chang-o-Āhang, Sharar-e Sang, and Āhang-e Hijaz. His biographical sketch of Maulana Abul Kalam Azad was published in 1976.

Critical appraisal of the life and literary works of Arsh Malsiani was conducted by Jagan Nath Azad and published as Ānkhen Tarastain Hai, by Mehr Lal Soni Zia Fatehabadi and included as a separate chapter in his book Zaviyaha-e nigaah and by Birendar Parsad Saxena as Arsh Malsiani.

References

Further reading
1. Lall, Inder Jit; An Urdu Stalwart; National Herald, February 1981

Urdu-language poets from India
1908 births
1979 deaths
20th-century Indian poets
Indian male poets
20th-century Indian male writers
People from Peshawar
Writers from Amritsar
People from Amritsar district